Bernhard Raestrup (January 25, 1880 –July 20, 1959) was a German politician of the Christian Democratic Union (CDU) and former member of the German Bundestag.

Life 
He was a member of the German Bundestag from its first election in 1949 to 1957. In the parliament he represented 1949 as well as 1953 as directly elected delegate the constituency Beckum - Warendorf, in which he received 67.5% of the first votes in 1953.

Literature

References

1880 births
1959 deaths
Members of the Bundestag for North Rhine-Westphalia
Members of the Bundestag 1953–1957
Members of the Bundestag 1949–1953
Members of the Bundestag for the Christian Democratic Union of Germany